Jeannine M. Ryder is a U.S. Air Force brigadier general and the Chief of the Air Force Nurse Corps. Ryder also serves as the Commander, 59th Medical Wing, Joint Base San Antonio-Lackland, and director, San Antonio Market, Defense Health Agency. Ryder, an Air Force nurse, is the first female commander of two Air Force wings. Ryder was also the first female commander at Keesler Medical Center, the first female commander of the 711th Human Performance Wing in Air Force Research Laboratory, and the first female commander of the 59th Medical Wing.

Ryder commands the Air Force Medical Service’s largest healthcare, medical education and readiness platform comprising six groups and 8,400 personnel. The wing provides 900,000 clinic visits, 18,000 surgical procedures, and greater than 300 worldwide deployments annually.

As the Director for the San Antonio Market, Ryder directs and manages the overall operations and resources of an integrated, joint-service health system that provides health care to more than 250,000 military Tricare beneficiaries. The San Antonio Market includes Brooke Army Medical Center, Wilford Hall Ambulatory Surgical Center, 10 stand-alone military treatment facilities, and over 100 specialty services.

As Chief Nurse of the Air Force, Ryder creates and evaluates policies and programs for 19,000 active-duty, Guard and Reserve nursing personnel. She interacts with Air Staff, Joint Staff, Department of Defense, Department of Veterans Affairs and civilian health care organizations to ensure the highest caliber of nursing care and personnel.

Early life and education 
Ryder, a Pittsfield, Massachusetts native, is a graduate of Boston College, where she earned a Bachelor of Science degree in nursing. She earned her Master of Science in Human Relations from the University of Oklahoma, a Master of Arts and Science in Military Operations from the Air Command and Staff College, and a Master of Science in Strategic Studies from the Air War College.

Ryder was commissioned as a second lieutenant in 1991.

Ryder credits her family for providing her foundation. "My work ethic came from my parents. And it wasn’t just about academics. I was out there mowing our acre of grass, and contributing – doing my share," she said. "Mom, who was a teacher and stayed home to raise me and my two sisters, she taught us that details are critical. No matter what the task – do it to the best of your ability. She and my dad were great role models on important things – from interactions with people to the importance of family to work ethic."

Military career 

Ryder's military career began in 1991 in the Nurse Intern Program (Obstetrics) at Langley Air Force Base, VA. She served as clinical nurse in the Obstetrical Unit, 36th Medical Group, Bitburg Air Base, and 52nd Medical Group at Spangdahlem Air Base, Germany, followed by an assignment in the Obstetrical Unit, 55th Medical Operations Squadron, Offutt Air Force Base, Nebraska.

She took on various leadership positions starting in 1996, to include Deputy Commander, Education and Training Flight at the 55th Medical Support Squadron; and Director, Education and Training, and deputy director, Human Resources, 78th Medical Group at Robins Air Force Base, Georgia.

Ryder then served as Nurse Manager for the Primary Care Team and Pediatric Flight Commander for the 436th Medical Operations Squadron, Dover Air Force Base, Delaware; and as deputy director, Communications Studies Course I, and Executive Officer to the Commandant at the Air Command and Staff College, Maxwell Air Force Base, Alabama. Ryder was then assigned to Kessler Air Force Base, Mississippi, where she served as the Maternal-Child Flight Commander, 81st Inpatient Operations Squadron, followed by a deployment to Kabul, Afghanistan, as the executive officer/Aide-de-Camp, Combined Air Power Transition Force. Returning to Kessler Air Force Base, Ryder became the Deputy Commander, 81st Inpatient Operations Squadron and Deputy Chief Nurse Executive.

In 2009, Ryder took command of the 75th Medical Operations Squadron, Hill Air Force Base, Utah, before taking a position as Chief, Strategic Medical Plans Division, Air Force Medical Service Agency, Defense Health Headquarters, Falls Church, Virginia.

Ryder also served as Commander, 386th Expeditionary Medical Group, Southwest Asia; Commander, 72nd Medical Group, Tinker Air Force Base, Oklahoma; Commander, 81st Medical Group, Keesler Air Force Base; Command Surgeon, Headquarters Air Force Materiel Command, Wright-Patterson Air Force Base, Ohio; and Commander, 711th Human Performance Wing, Wright-Patterson Air Force Base, Ohio.

On August 3, 2020, Ryder was promoted to brigadier general at the National Museum of the United States Air Force, Wright-Patterson Air Force Base, Ohio. She also became the Chief of the Air Force Nurse Corps that year.

“I am humbled and honored to be provided the opportunity of this promotion and the ability of continued service in the Air Force,” Ryder said during her promotion ceremony. “I am fortunate to work with great Airmen and Medics and care for the most deserving patients in the world."

Ryder took command of the 59th Medical Wing during a change of command ceremony at the Inter-American Air Forces Academy Auditorium, Joint Base San Antonio-Lackland, April 29, 2021.

Awards and honors

Medals

References

Living people
Brigadier generals
Women in the United States Air Force